For Hinduism in India, the Matayan is the sole authority to administer the Muthappan temple, found in the Kannur district of Kerala state, south India.

See also
Sree Muthappan
Muthappan temple

References

Hinduism in India